Alive and Kicking may refer to:

Business 
 Alive & Kicking (social enterprise), an African social enterprise
 "Alive and kicking", a 1986–1997 advertising campaign for McEwan's Lager
 Alive and Kicking, Inc., a division of Cartoon Network Studios

Film, theatre and television 
 Alive and Kicking (1959 film), a British comedy directed by Cyril Frankel 
 Alive and Kicking, US title of the British 1996 drama Indian Summer, directed by Nancy Meckler
 Alive and Kicking (2016 film), American documentary film about swing dancing, produced and directed by Susan Glatzer
 Alive and Kicking (musical), a 1950 Broadway musical revue
 Alive and Kicking (TV drama), a 1991 UK TV drama, starring Lenny Henry and Robbie Coltrane, produced for the anthology series Screen One
 Alive and Kicking (TV series), a 2021 Spanish television series

Music 
 Alive N Kickin' or Alive and Kicking, an American pop band
 Alive & Kicking (Delfonics album), 1974
 Alive & Kicking (Nana Mizuki album), 2004
 Alive & Kicking (Nazareth album), 2003
 Alive & Kicking (Shaan album), 1992
 Alive and Kicking, a 1983 album by Silverwing
 Alive and Kickin''', a 2006 album by Fats Domino
 "Alive and Kicking" (song), a 1985 song by Simple Minds
 "Alive and Kickin, a song by Mr.Big from Lean into It "Alive and Kicking", a song by Nonpoint from To the Pain Other media 
 Raving Rabbids: Alive & Kicking, a 2011 video game in the Raving Rabbids franchise
 Alive and Kicking, a 1994 novel by Michael Graubart Levin
 Alive & Kicking, a 1996 book by Rolf Benirschke
 Alive and Kicking: My Journey Through Football, Addiction and Life, a 2011 memoir by Chester Marcol

See also
 Alive and Cooking'', an Australian television cooking show which aired from 2008 to 2017
 Live and Kicking (disambiguation)